The 1920 Gori earthquake hit the Democratic Republic of Georgia on 20 February at . The shock had a surface wave magnitude of 6.2  and a maximum Mercalli Intensity of IX (Violent). Heavy damage (and between 114 and 130 deaths) affected the town of Gori and its medieval fortress.

See also
 List of earthquakes in 1920
 List of earthquakes in Georgia (country)

References

Earthquakes in Georgia (country)
Gori Earthquake, 1920
Gori
Gori, Georgia